Sacrificium is a Christian death metal band from Stuttgart, Germany, formed in 1993. The band made its breakthrough in the metal scene with its 2002 album Cold Black Piece of Flesh. The second album Escaping the Stupor was released on Black Lotus Records. Their music combines melodic passages with old school death metal, and their lyrics deal with personal experiences and opinions from Christian point of view.

Biography
Sacrificium has its roots in a band called Hardway, formed by Sebastian Wagner and Oliver Tesch. Musically, the band was pop rock oriented. That changed in 1991, when the session drummer Markus Hauth took the direction more towards a hard rock sound. In 1992, Hardway performed at the reputive Steiger 14 club in Amsterdam, the Netherlands. The band name was changed to Corpus Christi (not to be confused with Corpus Christi from Ohio) in 1993 and they began playing thrash metal. The style developed to death metal, and in 1994, after recording a demo, the name was changed to Sacrificium.

After a few line up changes in 1996, Sacrificium recorded its second demo and in 1998 another demo titled Mortal Fear was released. Although the demos were well-received, the vocalist Roman Wagner left Sacrificium in 2000. After that, the band played concerts with bands such as Extol, Dismember, Unleashed, The Black Dahlia Murder or My Darkest Hate. The second guitarist, Claudio Enzler, started performing vocals, and the guitarist position was taken by Ulrike Uhlmann.

In 2002 Sacrificium was signed to Whirlwind Records, who published the band's debut Cold Black Piece of Flesh. The album caught the attention of the press, and received positive reviews. For example, Rock Hard gave it 7.5/10 in its February 2004 issue. Afterwards they toured Europe with the band Brain[Faq].

On November 28, 2005, Sacrificium released its second album Escaping the Stupor on the Greek metal label Black Lotus Records.  The album features guest performances by Karl Walfridsson of Pantokrator and Simon Rosén of Crimson Moonlight.  Escaping the Stupor was well-received: Rock Hard gave it 7.5/10, Legacy 10/15 and Metalnews.de 6/7.

The band is currently working on new material and is updating its Facebook bulletin with pre-production demo takes and news.

Founding guitarist Oliver Tesch left the band in 2012, and was replaced by Wolfgang Nillies.

Guitarist Matthias Brandt and bass player Thorsten Brandt left the band on October 30, 2015 and have been replaced later on by Fred Berger and former member Ulrike Uhlmann.

On January 6, 2019, it was announced that longtime drummer Mario Henning was departing from the band. They therefore had to cancel their Mexico tour which would have been in April 2019.
At the same time the band announced to release an EP The Avowal of the Centurion in early 2019 and a full-length record in 2020. On March 16, 2019, it was announced that former bassist Thorsten Brandt would take over Henning's position on drums. On March 18, the band revealed that The Avowals of the Centurion would be released via Nordic Mission on April 19, 2019.

Discography
Studio albums
Cold Black Piece of Flesh (2002)
Escaping the Stupor (2005)
Prey for Your Gods (2013)

Members
Current
Claudio Enzler – vocals (2000–present), guitar (1994–2000)
Wolfgang Nillies - guitars (2012–present)
Frederik “Fred” Berger - guitars (2017–present)
Ulrike Uhlmann - bass (2017–present), guitars (1993-2010)
Thorsten Brandt – drums (2019–present), bass (2008–2017)

Former
Oliver Tesch – guitars (1991-2012)
Sebastian Wagner – bass, vocals (1991-1993)
Markus Hauth – drums (1991-1995)
Roman Wagner – vocals (1993-2000)
Manuel Iwansky – bass (1993-1997)
Manuel Kerkow - bass (1997)
Samuel Herbrich - bass (1997-2008)
Matthias Brandt – guitars (2010-2015)
Daniel Maucher - guitars (2015–2017)
Mario Henning - drums (1995-2019)

Timeline

References

External links 
 
 Sacrificum at Metal-Archives

German Christian metal musical groups
German death metal musical groups
Musical groups established in 1993